Berat Onur Pınar (born 12 June 2002) is a Turkish professional footballer who plays as a left-back for the Turkish club Antalyaspor.

Professional career
A youth product of Akhisarspor, Pınar began his senior career with them on 21 October 2020 in the TFF First League. He transferred to the Süper Lig club Antalyaspor on 21 September 2021, signing a 3+2 year contract. He made his professional debut with Antalyaspor in a 2–0 Turkish Cup win over Hatayspor on 9 February 2022.

References

External links
 
 Antalyaspor profile

2002 births
Living people
Sportspeople from Adapazarı
Turkish footballers
Association football fullbacks
Akhisarspor footballers
Antalyaspor footballers
Sakaryaspor footballers
Süper Lig players
TFF First League players